is a manga by Osamu Tezuka that began serialization in 1971.

Plot
In the future, birds have taken over Earth and replaced human kind as the dominant species.  With the assistance of bird-like aliens, the birds of Earth gained increased intelligence in 1975 and began to attack humans. Now humans are treated as livestock by the birds who have moved on to create their own society with laws, currency, countries, and class systems.  Ironically, the birds are following the same path as humans did.

Now, the meat-eating predatorial birds and the insect and grain eating birds have begun a war amongst each other that has no end in sight.  As they fight, aliens begin to consider what species should replace the birds as the dominant species of Earth in this science fiction thriller.

Characters
Komatsu Sakuemon no Josadatsne:
Oberon:
Liz:
Boku:
Nichora:
Pororo:
Beglar Yamaneko:
Police Inspector Mozz:
Rap:
Dobludo Chief:

Chapters

See also
List of Osamu Tezuka manga
Osamu Tezuka
Osamu Tezuka's Star System

References

External links
"Birdman Anthology" manga page at TezukaOsamu@World 
"Birdman Anthology" manga page at TezukaOsamu@World 
"Birdman Anthology" manga publications page at TezukaOsamu@World 
"Birdman Anthology" manga publications page at TezukaOsamu@World 

1971 manga
Osamu Tezuka manga
Science fiction anime and manga